Jussi Järventaus (born 7 July 1951) is a Finnish politician who served as the minister of justice and was the long term chairman of the Finnish Enterprises Federation.

Biography
Järventaus was born in Helsinki on 7 July 1951. In 1996 he became the chairman of the Finnish Enterprises Federation. He served as the minister of justice between 1998 and 1999. His tenure as the chairman of the Finnish Enterprises Federation ended in 2016.

References

External links

1951 births
Living people
Ministers of Justice of Finland
Politicians from Helsinki